Stephen, Steven, Steve, or Stevie Murray may refer to:

Stephen Murray (actor) (1912–1983), English cinema, radio, theatre and television actor
Stephen Murray (BMX rider) (born 1980), English former BMX rider
Stephen Murray (footballer) (born 1913), Scottish football player
Stephen Murray (historian) (born 1945), British architectural historian
Stephen O. Murray (born 1950), American sociologist and anthropologist
Stephen P. Murray, private equity investor and philanthropist
Steven Murray (footballer) (born 1967), Scottish professional footballer
Steven Murray (born 1975), Canadian cartoonist better known by his pen name Chip Zdarsky
Steven T. Murray (born 1943), American translator
Steve Murray (footballer) (born 1944), Scottish professional footballer
Steve Murray (politician), Australian politician
Stevie Murray (born 1983), Scottish footballer

Fictional characters
Steve Murray (Brookside), Brookside character